Philipp Petzschner and Tim Pütz are the defending champions, but decided not to defend their title .

Pierre-Hugues Herbert and Albano Olivetti won the title, defeating Nikola Mektic and Antonio Sancic in the final 6–3, 7–6(7–4) .

Seeds

Draw

References
 Main Draw

Wroclaw Open - Doubles